Aleš Dryml Jr. (born 19 October 1979) is a former motorcycle speedway rider from the Czech Republic.

Career
Dryml and his younger brother Lukáš Dryml were introduced to speedway by their father Aleš Dryml Sr., who was a former international speedway rider.

Dryml came to the British speedway leagues in 2000 when he and his brother Lukáš Dryml joined the Oxford Cheetahs for the 2002 Elite League speedway season. The pair came into the Oxford side relatively unknown because they had only ridden in the Czech Republic and Poland at the time. However, the British Authorities gave them inflated averages of 7.50 and 5.00, which would not help Oxford's 2000 league challenge as they finished second from last.

The following season in 2001, Oxford brought in Leigh Adams as heat leader and retained the Dryml brothers on reduced averages, this combination was a winning one, as the three riders were instrumental in helping Oxford win the 2001 Elite League. After the 2002 season with Oxford, Ales joined the Belle Vue Aces for the 2003 Elite League speedway season but was released so joined the Poole Pirates as a replacement for his brother who had broken his leg. Ales helped Poole finish the season as the league and cup double winners.

In 2004, he joined Peterborough Panthers and would also win his first of four European Pairs Speedway Championships. The other would come in 2007, 2009 and 2010. He also became a permanent rider of 2004 Speedway Grand Prix series. 

After the 2005 season wth Peterborough he retunred to his first club Oxford during 2006 and 2007 but rarely rode as his form dipped. However, he continued to ride in British speedway until the end of the 2014 season with Peterborough where he recorded a strong 7.90 average. He also represented the Czech Republic at the Speedway World Cup from 1999 to 2014.

Results
 Individual World Championship (Speedway Grand Prix)
 2002 - 41st place (1 point)
 2003 - 36th place (3 points)
 2004 - 22nd place (22 points)
 2005 - 26th place (3 points)
 2013 - 17th place (16 points)
 Individual U-21 World Championship
 1999 - 2nd place (11 points)
 2000 - 4th place (11+X points)
 Team World Championship (Speedway World Cup)
 1999 - 2nd place (10 points)
 2001 - 7th place (9 points in Race-Off)
 2002 - 5th place (13 points)
 2003 - 6th place (11 points in Race-Off)
 2004 - 6th place (4 points in Race-Off)
 2005 - 6th place (4 points in Race-Off)
 2007 - 9th place (10 points in Qualifying Round 2)
 2008 - 7th place (0 points in Event 2)
 2009 - 8th place 
 2010 - 8th place
 2011 - 7th place
 2012 - 7th place
 2013 - 4th place
 2014 - 7th place
 Individual European Championship
 2001 - 10th place (7 points)
 2005 - 2nd place (14+2 points)
 2009 - 3rd place (13 points)
 2010 - 2nd place (12 points)
 2011 - 3rd place (12 points)
 2012 - European Champion
 Individual U-19 European Championship
 1998 - 2nd place (13 points)
 European Pairs Championship
 2004 - European Champion (12 points)
 2005 - 2nd place (14 points)
 2006 - 4th place, but injury in Final (8 points in Semi-Final 1)
 2007 - European Champion (10 points)
 2009 - European Champion
 2010 - European Champion (13 points)
 Individual Czech Republic Championship
 2011 - Czech Champion
 2013 - Czech Champion
 Individual Junior Czech Republic Championship
 2004 - 3rd place (13+1 points)
 2005 - 4th place (12+0 points)
 Individual Czech Republic Long Track Championship
 2012 - Czech Champion
 Czech Republic Pairs Championship
 2015 - Czech Champions
 Czech Golden Helmet
 2004 - 2nd  place
 2005 - 3rd place
 Individual German Championship
 1998 - 3rd place (12 points)
 1999 - 10th place
 2000 - 5th place (10 points)
 2001 - 2nd place (13+2 points)
 2003 - 6th place
 Individual Junior German Championship
 1996 - 2nd place
 1998 - German Champion

World Longtrack Championship

Grand-Prix
 2012 - Qualifying Round

Team Championship
 2011  Scheeßel (4th) 7/36pts (Rode with Josef Franc, Richard Wolff, Pavel Ondrasik.
 2012  St. Macaire (5th) 16/30 (Rode with Josef Franc, Richard Wolff, Michael Hadek.

European Grasstrack Championship

 2011  Skegness (13th)5pts
 2012  Eenrum (6th) 20pts

See also 
 List of Speedway Grand Prix riders
 Czech Republic national speedway team

References

1979 births
Living people
Czech speedway riders
Belle Vue Aces riders
Oxford Cheetahs riders
Peterborough Panthers riders
Poole Pirates riders
Wolverhampton Wolves riders
European Pairs Speedway Champions
Individual Speedway Long Track World Championship riders
Sportspeople from Pardubice